Colonel Sir Donald Walter Cameron of Lochiel,  (4 November 1876 – 11 October 1951) was a Scottish nobleman and soldier of the Queen's Own Cameron Highlanders who served in the Second Boer War and the First World War. He was the 25th Lochiel of Clan Cameron, succeeding his father, the 24th Lochiel in 1906.

Lochiel began his career as an officer during the Second Boer War in Southern Africa and was later based in India. In 1914 he was asked by Field Marshal Herbert Kitchener to raise the Queen's Own Cameron Highlanders and served as Colonel of the regiment from 1914 to 1916. The casualties his battalions sustained during the war was said to have deeply affected him. After the war he retired to his estates in Lochaber with interests in sheep farming and land management.

Early life 
Lochiel was born in 1876 at Dalkeith Palace, the eldest son of Donald Cameron, 24th Lochiel, a diplomat and courtier, and his wife Lady Margaret Scott. His mother was the second daughter of Walter Montagu Douglas Scott, 5th Duke of Buccleuch. Lochiel spent his early years at Dalkeith Palace, Montagu House and Achnacarry Castle, seat of Clan Cameron in the Highlands. He had three brothers: Ewan, Allan and Archibald; two of whom would be killed during the First World War.

He was educated at Harrow School and attended Royal Military Academy Sandhurst.

Career 
Cameron was commissioned a Second lieutenant in the Grenadier Guards on 5 September 1896, and promoted to lieutenant on 8 September 1898. He served in South Africa 1899-1900 during the Second Boer War, where he was part of the Kimberley relief force, and was wounded at the Battle of Belmont (November 1899). He was in South Africa for the end of the war, and was invalided home in July 1902, when he left Cape Town on the SS Canada, returning to Southampton. Lochiel was back with his regiment the same month. In 1903 he was promoted to Captain. Lochiel was stationed in British India for several years before returning to Scotland in 1906.

In 1914 Lochiel (who was then commanding officer of the 3rd Reserve Battalion of the Queen's Own Cameron Highlanders) was asked by Field Marshal Herbert Kitchener, 1st Earl Kitchener to raise several battalions of infantry; Lochiel agreed, on condition that he would be Colonel; one of these became the 5th Service Battalion of the regiment, which saw distinguished service on the western front as part 9th (Scottish) Division. Allan George Cameron, Captain in the Lovat Scouts was killed in 1914 and Archibald, serving with Lochiel's Cameron Highlanders was killed in 1917 at Arras. The deaths of his younger brothers and the many others serving under his command deeply depressed Lochiel. He was invalided home in 1916 but resumed command of the 3rd Battalion in January 1918, when it was in Ireland. The poet Angus Robertson on the subject of Cameron Highlanders and Lovat Scouts during World War I wrote:

Between 1920 and 1936 he was aide-de-camp to King George V. Between 1923 and 1924, Lochiel and Lady Hermione undertook a tour of Canada and the United States. He was knighted in 1934, and from 1939 he held the office of Lord Lieutenant of Inverness-shire and Commissioner of the peace until his death in 1951. On 1 February 1941, Lochiel was appointed Commander, Inverness Group of the Home Guard.

Lochiel was a passionate advocate of the Gaelic revival and at various times served as Chief, Gaelic society of Inverness. He was also the first Cameron Chief to organise clan gatherings which took place for the first time in 1938.

During the Second World War he vacated his residence of Achnacarry to the British military for 25,000 soldiers to undergo elite training between 1942 and 1945. Achnacarry, transformed into the Commando Basic Training Centre was known to the soldiers as "Castle Commando".

Family 
In March 1906 he married Lady Hermione Emily Graham, daughter of Douglas Graham, 5th Duke of Montrose and Violet Graham, Duchess of Montrose; the couple had three sons and two daughters:
 Violet Hermione Cameron (6 May 1907 – 24 March 1979), married John Stewart of Ardvorlich and had issue.
 Col. Sir Donald Hamish Cameron of Lochiel (12 September 1910 – 4 May 2004), married Margot Gathorne-Hardy and succeeded as chief.
 Marion Hester Cameron (12 October 1914 – 31 May 1997), married Sir Ronald Orr-Ewing, 3rd Baronet and had issue.
 Maj. Allan John Cameron (25 March 1917 – 4 December 2011), father of Ewen Cameron, Baron Cameron of Dillington. His daughter married a second cousin, Lord Donald Alasdair Graham, son of the 7th Duke of Montrose.
 Lt Col. Charles Alexander Cameron (born 29 September 1920)

Footnotes

References

External links
 http://www.lochiel.net/chiefs/XXV.html  lochiel.net
 

1876 births
1951 deaths
Knights of the Thistle
Companions of the Order of St Michael and St George
Lord-Lieutenants of Inverness-shire
Deputy Lieutenants of Inverness-shire
Donald Walter
Lochiel, Donald Cameron, 8th Lord

Military personnel of the Second Boer War
Grenadier Guards officers
Queen's Own Cameron Highlanders officers